2-Aminothiazole is a heterocyclic amine featuring a thiazole core. It can also be considered a cyclic isothiourea. It possesses an odor similar to pyridine and is soluble in water, alcohols and diethyl ether. It is commonly used as a starting point for the synthesis of many compounds including sulfur drugs, biocides, fungicides, dyes and chemical reaction accelerators. 2-Aminothiazole can be used as a thyroid inhibitor in the treatment of hyperthyroidism and has antibacterial activity. Alternatively, its acid tartrate salt can be used. Recent studies using prion-infected neuroblastoma cell lines have suggested that aminothiazole may be used as a therapeutic drug for prion diseases.

Many 2-aminothiazoles and 2-amidothiazoles are drugs: avatrombopag, amthamine, amiphenazole, abafungin, acotiamide, pramipexole.

References

Amines
2-Thiazolyl compounds